The West Rutland School is a public secondary school located in Rutland County, Vermont. The school serves about 360 students.

References

External links 
West Rutland School web site

Public high schools in Vermont
Schools in Rutland County, Vermont